Marc Vucinovic (born 19 September 1988) is a German former professional footballer who played as a midfielder.

Career
Vucinovic started his senior career at the Niedersachsenliga side SV Bavenstedt, where he was a prolific goalscorer. He was then signed by Eintracht Braunschweig in 2008 and made his professional debut on 14 March 2009, in a 3. Liga game against 1. FC Union Berlin. However, due to injury problems Vucinovic never became a regular. He asked to be released from his contract in 2011 and went back into semi-professional football.

Vucinovic returned to the professional leagues in 2013, when his good performances at Havelse landed him a two-year-contract with 2. Bundesliga side SC Paderborn 07. On 24 August 2014, he made his top-flight debut for Paderborn, in a Bundesliga match against 1. FSV Mainz 05.

He retired after being released by Paderborn in summer 2018, due to a knee injury.

Personal life
In winter 2018 Vucinovic moved to Sarstedt als a player-coach.

References

External links
 
 

1988 births
Living people
German people of Serbian descent
German footballers
Footballers from Hanover
Association football midfielders
Bundesliga players
2. Bundesliga players
3. Liga players
Eintracht Braunschweig players
Eintracht Braunschweig II players
TSV Havelse players
SC Paderborn 07 players